Independent People's Party may refer to:

Independent People's Party (Ghana)
Independent People's Party (Kingdom of Croatia)
Independent People's Party (Luxembourg)